Meredith Morgan  was a  Welsh Anglican priest in the 16th century.

Morgan was educated at Jesus College, Oxford. He held Livings at Compton Beauchamp and Llanwrthwl. He was appointed  Archdeacon of Carmarthen in 1583, a post he held until his death on 4 December 1612.

References

Alumni of Jesus College, Oxford
Archdeacons of Carmarthen
16th-century Welsh Anglican priests
17th-century Welsh Anglican priests
1612 deaths